Samuel Stevens may refer to:

Samuel Stevens (naturalist) (1817–1899), British naturalist
Samuel Stevens, Jr. (1778–1860), American politician
Sammy Stevens (born 1890, date of death unknown), English footballer
Sam Stevens (footballer) (born 1935), Scottish footballer
Samuel Stevens (journalist)

See also
Samuel Stephens (disambiguation)